Shrawasti Lok Sabha constituency is one of the 80 Lok Sabha (parliamentary) constituencies in Uttar Pradesh state in northern India. This constituency came into existence in 2008 as a part of the implementation of delimitation of parliamentary constituencies based on the recommendations of the Delimitation Commission of India constituted in 2002.

Assembly segments and Serving MLAs
Shrawasti Lok Sabha constituency comprises five Vidhan Sabha (legislative assembly) segments. These are:

Shravasti, Tulsipur, Gainsari and Balrampur assembly segments were earlier in erstwhile Shravasti Lok Sabha constituency. Bhinga assembly segment was earlier in erstwhile Bahraich Lok Sabha constituency.

Members of Parliament

General Election Results

General Election 2019

General Election 2014

General Election 2009

See also
 Balrampur Lok Sabha constituency
 Shravasti district
 List of Constituencies of the Lok Sabha

Notes

References

External links
Shrawasti lok sabha  constituency election 2019 result details

Lok Sabha constituencies in Uttar Pradesh
Shravasti district